The 3 arrondissements of the Aveyron department are:
 Arrondissement of Millau, (subprefecture: Millau) with 110 communes.  The population of the arrondissement was 79,346 in 2016.  
 Arrondissement of Rodez, (prefecture of the Aveyron department: Rodez) with 79 communes.  The population of the arrondissement was 111,180 in 2016.  
 Arrondissement of Villefranche-de-Rouergue, (subprefecture: Villefranche-de-Rouergue) with 96 communes.  The population of the arrondissement was 88,171 in 2016.

History

In 1800 the arrondissements of Rodez, Espalion, Millau, Saint-Affrique and Villefranche-de-Rouergue were established. The arrondissements of Espalion and Saint-Affrique were disbanded in 1926. 

The borders of the arrondissements of Aveyron were modified in January 2017:
 six communes from the arrondissement of Millau to the arrondissement of Rodez
 19 communes from the arrondissement of Rodez to the arrondissement of Millau
 34 communes from the arrondissement of Rodez to the arrondissement of Villefranche-de-Rouergue

References

Aveyron